Hege Skjeie (15 May 1955 – 5 October 2018) was a Norwegian political scientist and feminist.

Biography
She became a Dr. Polit. in political science in 1992 and was hired as associate professor of political science at the University of Oslo in 1997.
She was promoted to professor in 2000, and thus became Norway's first female Professor of Political Science. In 2010, she was appointed chairperson of the Equality Commission (also known as the Skjeie Commission) by the Government of Norway, established by a royal decree of 12 February 2010 in order to report on Norway’s equality policies.

She worked as a researcher at the Norwegian Institute for Social Research from 1984 to 1997, and was a visiting scholar at Harvard University from 1988 to 1989. She was Adjunct Professor at Aalborg University from 2008 to 2012. She was also a columnist for the newspaper Dagens Næringsliv.

Selected publications

References

1955 births
2018 deaths
People from Kristiansand
University of Oslo alumni
Norwegian political scientists
Academic staff of the University of Oslo
Feminist studies scholars
Academic staff of Aalborg University
Norwegian women academics
Norwegian columnists
Norwegian women columnists
Women political scientists